NGC 364 is a barred lenticular galaxy in the constellation Cetus. It was discovered on September 2, 1864 by Albert Marth. It was described by Dreyer as "very faint, very small."

The galaxy is both visually and physically close to the elliptical galaxy NGC 359. A recent gravitational interaction between the two galaxies has created a large, faint tidal tail extending away from NGC 359 towards and below NGC 364. A small tidal star shell intersects this tail, strengthening the likelihood for a recent disturbance.

References

External links
 

0364
18640902
Cetus (constellation)
Lenticular galaxies
003833